The 2018 European Championship is an international rugby league tournament that took place in October and November 2018. Four teams competed in the tournament, which forms the top tier of European international competition, and the first stage of qualification for the 2021 Rugby League World Cup. The winner and runner-up will automatically qualify for the World Cup, while the third and fourth placed teams will enter the European play-off qualifying competition.

Teams
The championship will be contested by the national teams of France, Ireland, Scotland and Wales. Wales are the defending champions having won the previous competition, the 2015 European Cup.

Standings
The championship is a single round-robin tournament with two points awarded for a win and one point for a draw.  The matches will take place over three consecutive weekends commencing 26 October 2018.

Fixtures

Notes:
 James Bentley, Lewis Bienek, Liam Byrne, Jack Higginson, Ronan Michael, Declan O'Donnell, Ethan Ryan, Michael Ward (all Ireland), Davey Dixon, Nick Glohe, Finn Hutchison, Sam Luckley, Murray Mitchell, Kieran Moran, and Luke Westman (all Scotland) made their Test debuts.

Notes:
 Rhys Curran (France), Connor Davies, Curtis Davies, Sion Jones, and James Olds (all Wales) made their Test debuts, while Chris Vitalini made his debut for Wales after previously representing Italy.

Notes:
 Craig Borthwick, Craig Robertson (both Scotland), Mike Butt, and Elliott Jenkins (both Wales) made their Test debuts.

Notes:
 Ed O'Keefe (Ireland) made his Test debut.
 France became the 9th team to qualify for the 2021 Rugby League World Cup.

Notes:
 Gavin Marguerite (France), Hamish Bentley, Matt Hogg, Niall Sidney, and Dan Turland (all Scotland) made their Test debuts.

Notes:
 Wales became the 10th team to qualify for the 2021 Rugby League World Cup.

Media coverage

References

2018 in Welsh rugby league
2018 in Scottish sport
2018 in Irish sport
2018 in French rugby league
2018 Rugby League European Championship
2021 Rugby League World Cup
October 2018 sports events in Europe
November 2018 sports events in Europe